The 1920 Cal Poly Mustangs football team represented California Polytechnic School—now known as California Polytechnic State University, San Luis Obispo—as an independent during the 1920 college football season. Led by Herman Hess in his second and final season as head coach, Cal Poly compiled a record of 1–4 and were outscored by their opponents 65 to 17.

Cal Poly was a two-year school until 1941.

Schedule

References

Cal Poly
Cal Poly Mustangs football seasons
Cal Poly Mustangs football